Urbano Vilella Caldeira Filho (9 January 1890 – 13 March 1933), known as Urbano Caldeira, was a Brazilian football player and manager at Santos FC. His position was central defender.

Career
Born in Florianópolis, Santa Catarina, Caldeira moved to São Paulo after becoming an employee of the Brazilian customs agency. 

After representing Sport Club Germânia and Associação Atlética das Palmeiras, Caldeira joined Santos FC in 1913, when the club had its first season in football.

Caldeira was a player-manager of Santos FC for two years, also helping in the construction of the club's stadium in 1916. In 1917, he retired, but remained with the club as a member of the board.

In 1921, Caldeira was again appointed manager of Santos FC. He remained in the role until 1932, and died on 13 March 1933, one day after the club's first professional match.

Honours
Shortly after Caldeira's death, Santos FC's board decided to name the club's stadium after him: Estádio Urbano Caldeira, in honor of his years of dedication for the club. In 1938, the club also stated that 9 January would be "Urbano Caldeira Day".

See also
List of one-club men

References

External links
Urbano Caldeira profile at O Universo de Alma 

1890 births
1933 deaths
Sportspeople from Florianópolis
Brazilian footballers
Association football defenders
Santos FC players
Brazilian football managers
Santos FC managers